Mohammed al-Sabry (also spelled al-Sabri) was a Yemeni politician and an opposition leader (also identified as a spokesman) for the Common Forum coalition of opposition parties (which includes Reform, Socialist, Nasserist, Popular Force and al-Haq) in the 2011 Yemeni protests.

Sabry was a critic of the Houthi coup d'état in 2015, predicting it would lead to Yemen being isolated on the international and regional stage. He passed away on 25 November 2016.

See also
2011 Yemeni protests
Political parties in Yemen

References

External links
Mohammed Al-Sabri, Nasserite Party Leader, Abdul Baset Al-Qaderi, Yemen Post, 27 October 2008, interview

Yemeni politicians
Living people
Year of birth missing (living people)
2016 deaths